Ségou is a town and an urban commune in south-central Mali that lies  northeast of Bamako on the right bank of the River Niger. The town is the capital of the Ségou Cercle and the Ségou Region. With 130,690 inhabitants in 2009, it is the fifth-largest town in Mali.

History
In the middle of the 19th century there were four villages with the name of Ségou spread out over a distance of around  along the right bank of the river. They were, starting from the most upstream, Ségou-Koro (Old Ségou), Ségou-Bougou, Ségou-Koura (New Ségou) and Ségou-Sikoro. The present town is on the site of Ségou-Sikoro.

The village of Ségou-Koro prospered after Biton Mamary Coulibaly became king in 1712 and founded the Ségou Empire (also known as the Bambara or Bamana Empire). Mungo Park became the first European known to have visited the village in 1796. The empire gradually declined and was conquered by El Hadj Umar Tall's Toucouleur Empire in 1861, then by the French Army Colonel Louis Archinard in 1890.

Origin
Ségou has contested origins. Some claim that the word Ségou come from "Sikoro", meaning to the foot of a shea butter tree. Others argue that it was named after Cheikou, a marabout who founded the city, while still other theories support the claim that Ségou was founded by the Bozo fishermen coming from the north, who established their villages along the Niger River.

The 11th century CE saw an influx of the Soninke people, who were trying to escape from the collapse of the Ghana Empire, with Mandinka populations following. It is believed that Kaladian Coulibaly, founder of the Bambara Kingdom's Koulibaly dynasty established the first sedentary villages here at his time. The later Diarra dynasty moved the capital of the Bambara Kingdom to Ségou.

Ségou Koro
Ségou Koro is located about ten kilometres from Ségou, on the road to Bamako. Segou Koro was created by the founder of the Bambara dynasty. During the 17th century, Bambara coming from Djenné, led by Kaladian Coulibaly settled along the Niger River. Danfassari, Koulibaly's son continued his father's work by building his city there. After Koulibaly's death, his eldest grandson Mamari—also known as Biton—ruled the city and made it flourish.

Bambara Empire
The Bambaras from Djenné with Kaladian Coulibaly established their nation along the Niger River and founded the town of Ségou-Koro, which would serve as capital of the Bambara Empire. During during the time of the Bambara Empire, distinct urban architecture began to emerge at Ségou Koro, including mosques.

One of Koulibaly's descendants, Mamary Coulibaly, also known as Bitòn, became the chief of his tòn, an association of men, sometime after 1700. By 1712, Bitòn had used his military strength to displace local elders and expand the Bambara Empire. In the subsequent decades, he expanded its territory to encompass regional commerce centers such as Macina and Djenné. The city of Timbuktu would become a tributary state to Bitòn's Bambara Empire.

After Bitòn's death in 1755, Ngolo Diarra, who was reportedly one of the Coulibaly family slaves, won a brief civil war, and took control the Bambara Empire. Ngolo Diarra established the Diarra dynasty, which ruled Ségou until the mid-19th century. He moved the kingdom's capital from Segou-Koro to Ségou-Sikoro, close to the site of the current city.

By around 1800, the Bambara Empire conquered Timbuktu.

During the Bambara Empire, many  people lived in the town of Ségou, as documented by Mungo Park.

Toucouleur Empire 
On March 10, 1861, the Muslim Toucouleur leader, El Hadj Oumar Tall, conquered the town. On his death in 1864, he was succeeded by his son Ahmadu Tall. Ahmadu had to deal with Bambara rebellions and challenges from his brothers. Ahmadu continued to rule until the town's conquest by the French, when forces led by Colonel Louis Archinard entered the town on April 6, 1890.

French colonial rule 
France attempted indirectly ruling Ségou until March 13, 1893, when they incorporated the town as the capital of a local cercle. Ségou continued to serve as a regional commercial center throughout French rule.

Geography

Location 
The urban commune is bordered to the east by the commune of Pelengana, to the west by the commune of Sébougou and to the south by the commune of Sakoïba.

The commune is subdivided into 15 quartiers: Alamissani, Angoulême, Bagadadji, Bougoufié, Comatex, Dar Salam, Hamdallaye, Médine, Mission Catholique, Missira, Ségou Coura, Sido Soninkoura, Somono, Sokalakono, Bananissabakoro.

Climate
Ségou has a hot semi-arid climate (Köppen BSh). The city is irrigated by two important waterways: the Niger and the Bani River. Ségou has two seasons: a rainy season and a dry season. The rainy season starts in May and lasts about five months until September. Ségou's dry season includes a relatively mild period followed by a period of sweltering heat. The harmattan is the dominant wind in the dry season and it blows from north to south. The monsoon blowing from south to north-west is frequent during rainy season (hivernage).

Demography
As of the 2009 Mali Census, Ségou has a population of 130,690, up from 105,305 in 1998. A 2007 estimate put the city's population at 118,814.

The population of the Ségou Region is largely rural, and nomadic semi-sedentary or sedentary. The population consists of many ethnic groups, such as Bambara, Bozo, Fulani, Soninke, Malinke and Toucouleur.

The town of Ségou itself is home to a variety of ethnic groups, including the Malinke, the Soninke, the Fulani, and the Toucouleur, due to its complex history and status as a regional commercial center.

Bambaras are mostly farmers and are the most numerous ethnic group. Their language is Bambara or Djoula. The Bozos are the second most populous ethnic group. They typically live near the shore of the Niger river, in small towns of small houses. The Bozo economy is based on fishing. Bozo people have a monopoly on the transport system because of their knowledge of the Niger, its shallows and seasonal lakes, and are regarded as the masters of water. The , a group known to specialize in fishing and boating, are largely concentrated in Ségou and its surroundings. The Malinké/Mandinka/Maninka are closely related to Bambaras: They share costumes, religious beliefs, and practices with the Bambaras. The Marka, Saracollé or Soninke are merchants and warriors. The Soninke people are great travelers and Muslims, and have largely conserved their traditions.

Art and culture
The Bambaras used to transmit their knowledge by oral tradition, hence much of their art and culture is unknown. Ségou's cultural heritage includes traditional musical instruments, wonderful griots, folkloric groups and the traditional masks and marionettes. The history of the Bambara state's traditional religious practices are ambiguous. They practice animism and fetishism as cultural practices, and also totemic and monism (cult of ancestors). The most famous Ségou handcrafts are based on pottery, weaving (blankets, wrappers and carpets), manufacturing of Bogolan (a distinctive variation of Mud cloth), painting and sculpture. Ségou is also regarded as the capital of Malian pottery with a large pottery district in Kalabougou situated on the left bank. Women make the pottery by hand with the clay coming from the Niger River and bring the finished works to the local Monday market.

Festivals

The most well-known festival in Ségou is the annual Festival sur le Niger (Festival on the Niger). This festival celebrates music and the arts and culture of the Bambara people, and includes the Caravane culturelle de la paix since 2013. The 16th edition of the festival took place in 2019, when for the first time it combined with Ségou' Art, a contemporary  art fair. The two festivals continue to be combined for the 2023 event, which takes place over six days in early February.

Education 
The  was founded in 2009. As of 2008, Ségou has 13 kindergartens, 33 primary schools, 17 secondary schools, and 40 madrasas.

Places of worship 
Among the places of worship, they are predominantly Muslim mosques. There are also Christian churches and temples : Roman Catholic Diocese of Ségou (Catholic Church), Église Chrétienne Évangélique du Mali (Alliance World Fellowship), Assemblies of God.

Architecture

Ségou has two architectural styles: French Colonial and traditional Sudanese and neo-Sudanese. The Sudanese style influenced public building and important residences. Monuments and great mosques are also built according to this style. Many of Sudano-Sahelian's kings built imposing palaces in the cities over which they ruled and most of these buildings are in red clay. The materials used for building are generally quite poor and many of the buildings need to be restored to maintain their state.

Economy
Today, Ségou is known for its pottery, its market and its fishing industry.  Attractions in the old town of Ségou-Koro included a mosque, Coulibaly's tomb and an ancient tree.  In the city center, the main landmark is the water tower.

The most important economic activities are fishing, cattle herding and small scale farming. Millet is the main crop in Ségou, with other major cereals including sorghum, and cowpea. The main type of millet crop is rice pearl millet. Black-eyed peas are also grown. Crop yields in Ségou are generally low. Common types of livestock in Ségou includes sheep, poultry, cattle, goats, and donkeys. Both artisanal and commercial fishing are practiced in Ségou. Men often do the fishing, while women usually market the fish.

While most consumer goods are imported into Ségou, the city produces, and exports, handicraft and agricultural products.

As of 2008, the town is served by two telecom operators: Ikatel and Sotelma.

There are two factories processing cotton: Compagnie Malienne des Textiles (COMATEX) and Compagnie malienne pour le développement du textile (CMDT). Commerce consists mostly of the small scale exchange and sale of products from the primary sector, sold weekly at the large Sudano-Sahelian market, drawing customers from far outside of the city. The main products sold are vegetables, pottery, cotton, leather, fruit, ovens, cattle and cereals.

The headquarters of the Office du Niger is based in the town. The Office du Niger is a semi-autonomous government agency that administers a large irrigation scheme in the Ségou Region to the north of the Niger River.

Ségou used to be served by Ségou Airport (IATA: SZU, ICAO: GASG). The airport lay south-west of the city center and is visible on old maps as well as satellite imagery.

Notable residents
Notable people from Ségou include Adame Ba Konare, Fanta Damba, Garan Fabou Kouyate, Mountaga Tall, and Bassekou Kouyate.

Maryse Condé's historical novel Segu tells the city's history from 1797 to its 1860 defeat by El Hajj Oumar Tall's army.

International relations

Twin towns – sister cities
Ségou is twinned with:
  Angoulême, France, since 1984.
  Richmond, Virginia, United States.

See also
 Bamana Empire: for the Ségou Empire
 List of cities in Mali

References

Sources
.
.
.
.
.

Further reading
.

External links

Ségou Tourist Office

 
Populated places in Ségou Region
Regional capitals in Mali
Communities on the Niger River
Populated places established in 1620
French West Africa
Bamana
1620 establishments in Africa